No. 1 Air Mobility Wing RAF is a combat service support wing of the British Royal Air Force currently operating as part of No. 2 Group RAF and based at RAF Brize Norton.

History

UKMAMS 
Formed at RAF Abingdon in 1966 as the UK based mobile movements capability. In 1974, following the closure of RAF Abingdon and its consequential hand-over to the Army, the squadron moved to RAF Lyneham.  At this time, the squadron amalgamated with the existing station movements squadron to provide a dual Base and Mobile capability.

On 1 October 2006, the squadron was expanded into what is now No. 1 Air Mobility Wing.

Wing 
In 2012, following the closure of RAF Lyneham, the Wing moved to its current home of RAF Brize Norton.  The Wing currently operates as part of the RAF's A4 (Support) Force, sitting alongside the headquarters of the Air Mobility Force.

No. 1 Air Mobility Wing is a high readiness air combat service support unit, capable of providing early entry air movements support, both in the United Kingdom and abroad, to operations and exercises.  United Kingdom Mobile Air Movements Squadron (UKMAMS) comprises five mobile flights which provide dedicated manpower to meet exercise and operational tasking, both contingent and enduring.  The Operational Support Squadron (OSS) provides all logistics support to UKMAMS, plus permanent air movements detachments (PAMDs) at five locations worldwide.

Structure 
The structure of the wing is as follows:

 Wing Headquarters.
 Operational Support Squadron.
 United Kingdom Mobile Air Movements Squadron (UKMAMS) (5 x mobile flights).
 Air Movements Squadron (Providing 24/7 cover to handle flights arriving and departing RAF Brize Norton).

Squadron badges

References 

Military units and formations established in 2006
2006 establishments in the United Kingdom
Air Mobility 001
Logistics units and formations of the Royal Air Force
Military units and formations of the United Kingdom in the War in Afghanistan (2001–2021)